Andrea Marisa Victoria Tessa Vergara (born January 1, 1961 in Santiago) is a Chilean singer-songwriter, TV presenter, and actress of Italian descent. Daughter of the operatic soprano Victoria Vergara Olguín and Patricio Tessa Marchant. She studied at Scuola Italiana de Santiago.

She started her musical career in 1979, singing "Decir te Quiero", a song written by Scottie Scott, winning for Best Interpreter at the Viña del Mar International Song Festival.

Her first album was Páginas (1996), followed by Equipaje Clandestino (2002), Tribute (2007) and Leaving Home (2008) which won Best Album of the Year in the 2011 APES awards.

She was the host of the television show Más Música from 1984 to 1992. In 1989 she debuted as an actress in the TV movie Bravo. She appeared as the vocal coach of the Italian chorus (Italian immigrants or descendants) in the TV show Todos a Coro hosted by Rafael Araneda and Karen Doggenweiler. She and her chorus won second place.

Discography
 Páginas (1996)
 Equipaje Clandestino (2002)
 Concierto de Oraciones (2004)
 Tribute (2007)
 Leaving Home (2008)

Filmography
 Bravo (1989) (TV)

References

External links 
 

1961 births
Chilean telenovela actresses
20th-century Chilean women singers
Chilean jazz singers
Chilean pop singers
Chilean singer-songwriters
Chilean people of Italian descent
Living people
People from Santiago
Vergara family
Chilean women television presenters
21st-century Chilean women singers